Deldoul is a commune in Aougrout District, Adrar Province, in south-central Algeria. According to the 2008 census it has a population of 8,647, up from 7,465 in 1998, with an annual growth rate of 1.5%.

Geography

Deldoul commune is centered on a set of oases in the south-central Gourara region of northern Adrar Province, southwest of Timimoun, southeast of Charouine, west of Aougrout and northeast of Metarfa. The surrounding areas generally consist of rocky plains mixed with low sand dunes.

Climate

Deldoul has a hot desert climate (Köppen climate classification BWh), with extremely hot summers and mild winters, and very little precipitation throughout the year.

Transportation

A road connects the main villages in the commune from Bel Rhazi in the north to Ouled Abbou in the south. The main road out of the area leads east from Ouled Abbou to Aougrout.

Education

3.3% of the population has a tertiary education, and another 10.8% has completed secondary education. The overall literacy rate is 74.4%, and is 88.3% among males and 60.6% among females.

Localities
As of 1984, the commune was composed of 11 localities:

Ouled Abbou
Aourir
Akbour
El Mansour
El Hadbane
Igosten
El Barka
Toukki
Ouled Abd Es Semod
Belrhazi
Sahla

References

Neighbouring towns and cities

Communes of Adrar Province
Adrar Province